Carlo Zoppellari (July 13, 1921 in Lendinara – 2011) was an Italian professional football player.

References

1921 births
2011 deaths
Italian footballers
Serie A players
Inter Milan players
Rovigo Calcio players
L.R. Vicenza players
Modena F.C. players
ACF Fiorentina players
S.S.C. Bari players
Association football midfielders